Anthony Geslin (born 9 June 1980) is a French retired professional road bicycle racer, who rode professionally between 2002 and 2015, for the  and  teams. Born in Alençon, Geslin won a bronze medal in the road race at the 2005 UCI Road World Championships.

Major results

1998
 1st Overall Trofeo Karlsberg
2000
 2nd La Côte Picarde
2001
 2nd La Côte Picarde
 9th Classic Loire Atlantique
2002
 4th Grand Prix de la Ville de Lillers
 7th Overall Tour de Picardie
 9th Tro-Bro Léon
 9th Paris–Bourges
2003
 1st Overall Criterium des Espoirs
 2nd Grand Prix Rudy Dhaenens
 2nd GP Ouest–France
 4th Tour de Vendée
 5th Polynormande
 8th Grand Prix de la Ville de Lillers
 10th Overall Four Days of Dunkirk
 10th Paris–Camembert
 10th Grand Prix de Denain
 10th Grand Prix de Wallonie
2004
 1st Route Adélie de Vitré
 5th Omloop van de Vlaamse Scheldeboorden
 7th Overall Tour du Poitou-Charentes
 9th Grand Prix de Rennes
2005
 1st Stage 3 Circuit de Lorraine
 3rd  Road race, UCI Road World Championships
 5th Châteauroux Classic
 8th Paris–Camembert
2006
 1st Paris–Camembert
 3rd Grand Prix d'Ouverture La Marseillaise
 3rd Route Adélie
2007
 1st Trophée des Grimpeurs
 9th Polynormande
2008
 1st Tour du Doubs
 3rd Tour de Vendée
 4th Tour du Haut Var
 6th Milan–San Remo
 8th Overall Paris–Corrèze
2009
 1st Brabantse Pijl
 2nd Road race, National Road Championships
 2nd Trophée des Grimpeurs
 3rd Tour du Finistère
 6th Grand Prix d'Isbergues
 8th Paris–Camembert
2010
 4th Grand Prix Pino Cerami
 9th Overall Four Days of Dunkirk
2011
 3rd Brabantse Pijl
 5th Tour du Doubs
 6th Classic Loire Atlantique
 7th Overall Tour du Limousin
 8th Overall Paris–Corrèze
2012
 6th Overall Tour du Limousin
2013
 2nd Overall Tour de Wallonie
 2nd Grand Prix de Plumelec-Morbihan
 3rd Overall French Road Cycling Cup
 3rd Tour du Finistère
 3rd Tro-Bro Léon
 6th Paris–Camembert
 8th Classic Loire Atlantique
 8th Tour du Doubs
2014
 4th La Roue Tourangelle
2015
 8th Paris–Camembert

References

External links

Palmares at CyclingBase (French)

French male cyclists
Sportspeople from Alençon
1980 births
Living people
Cyclists from Normandy